The Alice Cooper Show is a live album by Alice Cooper, released by Warner Bros. in December 1977.

It was recorded live in Las Vegas at the Aladdin Hotel on August 19 and 20, 1977, during Cooper's "King of the Silver Screen" United States tour. Before doing the gig that would become this album, Alice Cooper was exhausted from constant touring, recording and drinking. Contractual obligations resulted in him being heavily pressured into doing it. Alice states "Whenever a fan comes to me with this album to sign, I tell them I hate this album". The TV special Alice Cooper and Friends featured live footage from that tour.

The Alice Cooper Show was rereleased in 1987 on CD, digitally in 2005, and on 180-gram vinyl in 2013.

Track listing

Personnel 
Musicians
Alice Cooper – vocals
Steve Hunter – guitar
Dick Wagner – guitar, vocals
Prakash John – bass, vocals
Fred Mandel – keyboards
Whitey Glan – drums
Production
Pete Carlson – engineer
Brian Christian – producer
Bob Ezrin – producer
Shep Gordon – executive producer
Lee Herschberg – remastering
Dick Wagner – director

Charts

References 

Alice Cooper live albums
Albums produced by Bob Ezrin
1977 live albums
Warner Records live albums
Albums recorded at Planet Hollywood Resort & Casino